Joshua Booth (born October 29, 1979) is an American politician who served as a Delegate from the 19th District to the West Virginia House of Delegates from 2021 to 2022. Booth is a Republican.

Early life, education, and career
Booth was born in Huntington, West Virginia to Jeffery and Lisa Booth. Booth received a degree in business administration at Marshall University in 2004. He was employed at a highway and traffic construction firm before assuming office.

Elections

2021 appointment
On January 27, 2021, West Virginia governor Jim Justice appointed Booth to fill the seat of Delegate Derrick Evans. Evans was forced to resign after he was arrested after participating in the 2021 United States Capitol attack. A dispute arose when the Wayne County Republican Executive Committee claimed that the governor had unlawfully appointed Booth by not choosing from their submitted list of candidates. On February 9, 2021, the West Virginia Supreme Court ruled in favor of the governor. Booth was formally sworn in the following day. The Court reaffirmed their decision in June 2021.

Tenure

Committee assignments
Government Organization 
Senior, Children, and Family Issues
Technology & Infrastructure

Transgender rights
Booth voted for Senate Bill 341, a bill that would prohibit transgender athletes from competing on sports teams that align with their gender identity.

Worker's rights
Booth voted for SB 11, a bill that would make it more difficult for employees to strike.

Personal life
Booth is married to Stacy Booth and has two children. He is a Baptist.

References

1979 births
Living people
21st-century American politicians
Marshall University alumni
Politicians from Huntington, West Virginia
Republican Party members of the West Virginia House of Delegates